The 1987-88 LSU Tigers men's basketball team represented Louisiana State University during the 1987–88 NCAA men's college basketball season. The head coach was Dale Brown. The team was a member of the Southeastern Conference and played their home games at LSU Assembly Center.

The Tigers finished in a fourth-place tie in the SEC regular season standings, and lost to Kentucky in the semifinals of the SEC Tournament. LSU received an at-large bid to the NCAA tournament as No. 9 seed in the East region where they lost in the opening round to Georgetown. The team finished with a 16–14 record (10–8 SEC).

Roster

Schedule and results

|-
!colspan=9 style=| Exhibition

|-
!colspan=9 style=| Non-conference regular season

|-
!colspan=9 style=| SEC regular season

|-
!colspan=12 style=| SEC tournament

|-
!colspan=12 style=|NCAA tournament

Team players drafted into the NBA

References

LSU Tigers basketball seasons
Lsu
Lsu
LSU
LSU